The 1930–31 Ljubljana Subassociation League was the 12th season of the Ljubljana Subassociation League. I. SSK Maribor won the league for the first time after defeating Svoboda with 13–2 on aggregate in the final.

Celje subdivision

Ljubljana subdivision

Maribor subdivision

Semi-final

Final

References

External links
Football Association of Slovenia 

Slovenian Republic Football League seasons
Yugo
1
Football
Football